Following is a List of senators of Ardèche, people who have represented the department of Ardèche in the Senate of France.

Third Republic 

Senators for Ardeche under the French Third Republic were:

 Joachim Rampon (1876–1883)
 Adrien Tailhand (1876–1885)
 Arthur Chalamet (1883–1895)
 Victor Pradal (1885–1910)
 Oscar Soubeyran de Saint-Prix (1892–1903)
 Édouard Fougeirol (1896–1912)
 François Boissy d'Anglas (1903–1912)
 Placide Astier (1910–1918)
 Georges Murat (1912–1918)
 Auguste Vincent (1912–1915)
 Henri Chalamet (1920–1930)
 Isidore Cuminal (1920–1938)
 Édouard Roche (1920–1930)
 Jules Duclaux-Monteil (1930–1939)
 Henri de Pavin de Lafarge (1930–1945)
 Marcel Astier (1939–1945)
 Pierre Lautier (1939–1945)

Fourth Republic 

Senators for Ardeche under the French Fourth Republic were:

 Marcel Molle (1946–1959)
 Édouard Sauvertin (1946–1948)
 Franck Chante (1948–1955)
 Alphonse Thibon (1955–1959)

Fifth Republic 

Senators for Ardeche under the French Fifth Republic:

 Marcel Molle (1959–1971)
 Paul Ribeyre (1959–1980)
 Pierre Jourdan (1971–1980)
 Bernard Hugo (1980–1998)
 Henri Torre (1980–2008)
 Michel Teston (1998–2014)
 Yves Chastan (2008–2014)
 Jacques Genest (from 2014)
 Mathieu Darnaud (from 2014)

References

Sources

 
Ardeche